A dos Cunhados is a former civil parish in the municipality of Torres Vedras in the central Oeste subregion of Portugal. In 2013, the parish merged into the new parish A dos Cunhados e Maceira.

History
The settlement of this area, originated in the ancient Paleolithic period resulting from the fertility of the soils, enriched by margins of the Alcabrichel River.

The name A dos Cunhados reflected the first inhabitants: three brothers-in-law who inhabited a large estate, that was later divided amongst them and their descendants. But, from the writings of the Bishop, there were two brothers-in-law and not three (named the Quinta dos Dos Cunhados).

The parish of A dos Cunhados was created in 1581, by Jorge de Almeida, archbishop of Lisbon (with the permission of the Bishop of Targa) after he, in 1572 had authorized the first celebrations of mass in the local chapel (later church) two years earlier.

By 1527 there were 27 neighbors in the parish (that was formed by Aldeia dos Cunhados, ditas do Sobreiro Curvo, Paradas e Póvoa, dita da Maceira e dita da Pai e Correia com casais).

In 2001, 6,936 people inhabited the parish that included the villages of A dos Cunhados, Boavista, Bombardeira, Brejenjas, Casais do Rego, Casais da Serpegeira, Casais Vale da Borra, Casal da Barreirinha, Casal da Carrasquinha, Casal da Popa, Casal da Portela, Casal de Serpa, Casal da Varzinha, Casal das Paradas, Casal de Além, Casal do Seixo, Casal dos Feros, Casal Figueira Velha, Casal Ventoso, Louribetão, Palhagueiras, Pinheiro Manso, Póvoa de Além, Póvoa de Penafirme, Praia da Vigia, Quinta da Piedade, Santa Cruz–Pisão, Sobreiro Curvo, Vale Janelas and Valongo.

A dos Cunhados became a town on 21 June 1995, but the parish was subdivided in 1997, when Maceira was elevated to the status of civil parish.

References

Former parishes of Torres Vedras